The Convention of London of 1840 was a treaty with the title of Convention for the Pacification of the Levant, signed on 15 July 1840 between the Great Powers of United Kingdom, Austria, Prussia, Russia on one hand and the Ottoman Empire on the other. The Convention lent some support to the Ottoman Empire, which was having difficulties with its Egyptian possessions.

Because Muhammad Ali of Egypt did not accept the terms of the convention, the Oriental Crisis of 1840 resulted. Thus, Muhammad Ali finally had to accept the convention on 27 November 1840.

Negotiations
The treaty summarized recent agreements concerning the Ottoman Empire under Abdulmecid I, and its second war with Muhammad Ali's Egypt. It was brought about by the Great Powers' fear of the destabilizing effect an Ottoman collapse would have on Europe.

The Ottomans agreed to declare the Dardanelles closed to all non-Ottoman warships in peacetime. In return, the signatories offered to Muhammad Ali and his heirs permanent control over Egypt and the Eyalet of Acre if territories would remain part of the Ottoman Empire. If he did not accept withdrawal of his forces within ten days, he should lose the offer in Southern Syria; if he delayed acceptance more than 20 days, he should forfeit everything offered. He also had to return to Sultan Abdülmecid I the Ottoman fleet that had defected to Alexandria. Muhammad Ali was also to immediately withdraw his forces from Arabia, the Holy Cities, Crete, the district of Adana, all within the Ottoman Empire.

Oriental Crisis of 1840
The European powers agreed to use all possible means of persuasion to effect this agreement, but Muhammad Ali, backed by France, refused to accept its terms in the time given. That led to the Oriental Crisis of 1840, and British and Austrian forces attacked Acre, defeating his troops late in 1840. Muhammad Ali's forces faced increasing military pressure from Europe and the Ottoman Empire, fought a losing battle against insurgents in its captured territories, and saw the general deterioration of its military from the strain of the recent wars.

Muhammad Ali finally accepted the terms of the Convention and the firmans subsequently issued by the sultan, confirming his rule over Egypt and the Sudan. He withdrew from Syria and Crete and sent back the Ottoman fleet. The London Convention and the firmans were the legal basis for Egypt's status as a privileged Ottoman province. Later Egyptian nationalists cited them to discredit claims for the British occupation.

See also
London Straits Convention (1841)
History of Ottoman Egypt
History of Egypt under the Muhammad Ali dynasty

Notes

References
 Goldschmidt, A.; Johnston, R. (2004), Historical Dictionary of Egypt (3rd ed.), American University in Cairo Press, p. 243
 Berger, M. (1960), Military Elite and Social Change: Egypt Since Napoleon, Princeton: Center for International Studies, p. 11
 Rich, N. (1992), Great Power Diplomacy, 1814–1914. Boston: McGraw-Hill.

External links 
 Convention between Great Britain, Austria, Prussia, Russia and Turkey for the pacification of the Levant (text of the treaty, published in William Cargill: The Foreign Affairs of Great Britain; Google Books)

Ottoman Egypt
London 1840
London 1840
London 1840
1840 in London
London 1840
London
London 1840
London 1840
1840 in the United Kingdom
1840 in the Austrian Empire
1840 in Prussia
1840 in Germany
1840 in the Russian Empire
1840 in the Ottoman Empire
July 1840 events